The 1989 Tour du Haut Var was the 21st edition of the Tour du Haut Var cycle race and was held on 25 February 1989. The race started in Seillans and finished in Draguignan. The race was won by Gérard Rué.

General classification

References

1989
1989 in road cycling
1989 in French sport
February 1989 sports events in Europe